Kenneth Ross may refer to:
Kenneth Ross (screenwriter), Scottish-American screenwriter
Kenneth Bruce Ross (1897–1959), American inventor and businessman
Ken Ross (cyclist) (1900-1974), Australian road and track cyclist
Kenneth G. Ross (born 1941), Australian playwright and screenwriter
Ken Ross (footballer) (born 1927), Australian rules footballer
Ken Ross (photographer), American photographer
Kenneth A. Ross (born 1936), mathematician
Kenneth A. Ross Jr., member of the California Assembly
Ken Ross (bishop) (born 1964), American Anglican bishop